Martina Hingis and Leander Paes were the defending champions, but lost in the second round to CoCo Vandeweghe and Rajeev Ram.

Laura Siegemund and Mate Pavić won the title, defeating Vandeweghe and Ram in the final, 6–4, 6–4.

Seeds

Draw

Finals

Top half

Bottom half

Other entry information

Wild cards

Alternates

External links
2016 US Open – Doubles draws and results at the International Tennis Federation

Mixed Doubles

US Open - Mixed Doubles
US Open (tennis) by year – Mixed doubles